The 2008–09 Segunda División B season was the 32nd since its establishment. The first matches of the season were played on 30 August 2008, and the season ended on 21 June 2009 with the promotion play-off finals.

Group 1
Teams from Asturias, Basque Country, Cantabria, Castile and León and Galicia.

Summary before 2008–09 season 
Scores and Classification - Group 1
Playoffs de Ascenso:
 SD Ponferradina - Eliminated in Second Round
 SD Huesca - Promoted to Segunda División
 Zamora CF - Eliminated in Second Round
 Barakaldo CF - Eliminated in First Round

Promoted to this group from Tercera División:
 Racing Santander B - Founded in: 1926//, Based in: Santander, Cantabria//, Promoted From: Group 3
 Sporting de Gijón B - Founded in: 1967//, Based in: Gijón, Asturias//, Promoted From: Group 2

Relegated to this group from Segunda División:
 Racing de Ferrol - Founded in: 1919//, Based in: Ferrol, Galicia//, Relegated From: Segunda División

Relegated to Tercera División:
Logroñés CF - Founded in: 2000//, Based in: Logroño, La Rioja//, Relegated to: Group 16
Burgos - Founded in: 1994//, Based in: Burgos, Castile and León//, Relegated to: Group 8
Palencia - Founded in: 1975//, Based in: Palencia, Castile and León//, Relegated to: Group 8
Peña Sport - Founded in: 1925//, Based in: Tafalla, Navarre//, Relegated to: Group 15

Teams

League table

Results

Top goalscorers
Last updated 10 May 2009

Top goalkeepers
Last updated 10 May 2009

Group 2
Teams from Canary Islands, Community of Madrid, Region of Murcia, Extremadura and La Rioja.

Summary before 2008–09 season 
Scores and Classification - Group 2
Playoffs de Ascenso:
 Rayo Vallecano - Promoted to Segunda División
 Pontevedra CF - Eliminated in First Round
 UD Fuerteventura - Eliminated in First Round
 Deportivo B - Eliminated in First Round

Promoted to this group from Tercera División:
 CDA Navalcarnero - Founded in: 1961//, Based in: Navalcarnero, Community of Madrid//, Promoted From: Group 7
 Las Palmas Atlético - Founded in: 1941//, Based in: Las Palmas de Gran Canaria, Canary Islands//, Promoted From: Group 12
 Sangonera Atlético - Founded in: 1996//, Based in: Sangonera la Verde, Region of Murcia//, Promoted From: Group 13
 Real Murcia Imperial - Founded in: 1924//, Based in: Murcia, Region of Murcia//, Promoted From: Group 13
 Atlético Ciudad - Founded in: 2007//, Based in: Lorquí, Region of Murcia//, Promoted From: Group 13
 Alfaro - Founded in: 1922//, Based in: Alfaro, La Rioja//, Promoted From: Group 16

Relegated to this group from Segunda División:
 None

Relegated to Tercera División:
CD Ourense - Founded in: 1952//, Based in: Ourense, Galicia//, Relegated to: Group 1
Fuenlabrada - Founded in: 1975//, Based in: Fuenlabrada, Community of Madrid//, Relegated to: Group 7
S.S. Reyes - Founded in: 1971//, Based in: San Sebastián de los Reyes, Community of Madrid//, Relegated to: Group 7
San Isidro - Founded in: 1970//, Based in: San Isidro, Canary Islands//, Relegated to: Group 12
Logroñés - Founded in: 1940//, Based in: Logroño, La Rioja//, Relegated to: Group 16

Teams

League table

Results

Top goalscorers
Last updated 10 May 2009

Top goalkeepers
Last updated 10 May 2009

Group 3
Teams from Balearic Islands, Catalonia, Valencian Community, and Navarre.

Summary before 2008–09 season 
Scores and Classification - Group 3
Playoffs de Ascenso:
 Girona FC - Promoted to Segunda División
 Alicante CF - Promoted to Segunda División
 CF Gavà - Eliminated in First Round
 Benidorm CD - Eliminated in First Round

Promoted to this group from Tercera División:
 Atlético Baleares - Founded in: 1920//, Based in: Palma de Mallorca, Balearic Islands//, Promoted From: Group 11
 Valencia Mestalla - Founded in: 1944//, Based in: Paterna, Valencian Community//, Promoted From: Group 6
 Barcelona Atlètic - Founded in: 1970//, Based in: Barcelona, Catalonia//, Promoted From: Group 5
 Alzira - Founded in: 1946//, Based in: Alzira, Valencian Community//, Promoted From: Group 6
 Sant Andreu - Founded in: 1909//, Based in: Barcelona, Catalonia//, Promoted From: Group 5
 Santa Eulàlia - Founded in: 1949//, Based in: Santa Eulària des Riu, Balearic Islands//, Promoted From: Group 11

Relegated to this group from Segunda División:
 None

Relegated to Tercera División:
Villajoyosa - Founded in: 1944//, Based in: Villajoyosa/La Vila Joiosa, Valencian Community//, Relegated to: Group 6
MiApuesta Castelldefels - Founded in: 1919//, Based in: Castelldefels, Catalonia//, Relegated to: Group 5
Espanyol B - Founded in: 1991//, Based in: Barcelona, Catalonia//, Relegated to: Group 5
CE L'Hospitalet - Founded in: 1957//, Based in: L'Hospitalet de Llobregat, Catalonia//, Relegated to: Group 5
Levante B - Founded in: 1961//, Based in: Valencia, Valencian Community//, Relegated to: Group 6

Teams

League table

Results

Top goalscorers
Last updated 10 May 2009

Top goalkeepers
Last updated 10 May 2009

Group 4
Teams from Andalusia, Castile-La Mancha, Ceuta and Melilla.

Summary before 2008–09 season 
Scores and Classification - Group 4
Playoffs de Ascenso:
 Écija Balompié - Eliminated in Second Round
 CD Linares - Eliminated in First Round
 AD Ceuta - Eliminated in Second Round
 Mérida UD - Eliminated in First Round

Promoted to this group from Tercera División:
 Roquetas - Founded in: 1970//, Based in: Roquetas de Mar, Andalusia//, Promoted From: Group 9
 San Fernando - Founded in: 1943//, Based in: San Fernando, Andalusia//, Promoted From: Group 10
 Antequera - Founded in: 1992//, Based in: Antequera, Andalusia//, Promoted From: Group 9
 Real Balompédica Linense - Founded in: 1912//, Based in: La Linea de la Concepción, Andalusia//, Promoted From: Group 13

Relegated to this group from Segunda División:
 Polideportivo Ejido - Founded in: 1969//, Based in: El Ejido, Andalusia//, Relegated From: Segunda División
 Granada 74 CF - Founded in: 2007//, Based in: Granada, Andalusia//, Relegated From: Segunda División
 Cádiz CF - Founded in: 1910//, Based in: Cádiz, Andalusia//, Relegated From: Segunda División

Relegated to Tercera División:
CD Baza - Founded in: 1970//, Based in: Baza, Andalusia//, Relegated to: Group 9
CD Alcalá - Founded in: 1946//, Based in: Alcala de Guadaira, Andalusia//, Relegated to: Group 10
Mazarrón - Founded in: 1928//, Based in: Mazarrón, Region of Murcia//, Relegated to: Group 13
Talavera - Founded in: 1948//, Based in: Talavera de la Reina, Castile-La Mancha//, Relegated to: Group 18
Algeciras - Founded in: 1912//, Based in: Algeciras, Andalusia//, Relegated to: Group 10

Teams

League table

Results

Top goalscorers
Last updated 10 May 2009

Top goalkeepers
Last updated 10 May 2009 

 
2008-09
3
Spain